"Sideways" is the first single by Canadian new wave/synthpop band Men Without Hats from the album of the same name, released in 1991.

History 
In the press release, bandleader Ivan Doroschuk described "Sideways" as being about how there are other ways of looking at things. In an interview with The Georgia Straight in July 1991, he also described how "Sideways" was originally an ode to early morning sex.

The song itself is a hard rock song in E major.

Music video 
A music video was filmed for "Sideways", showing the band playing the song.

References 

1991 singles
Men Without Hats songs